Espita is a town in Espita Municipality, Yucatan (Mexico) located on the Litoral Oriente (East Coast) or Region I of Yucatan. It has an average height of 27 meters and is located at a distance of 165 km from the Merida City, 80 km from Izamal, 58 km from Chichen Itza, 49 km from Valladolid, 35 km from Ek' Balam and 27 km from Tizimín.

During pre-Hispanic times, the site where the town stands today was part of the province of the cupules, where later, with the arrival of the Spanish, was founded the present town and established the encomienda system in 1549. Since colonization vast buildings were built, among which stands the church dedicated to St. Joseph. In the nineteenth century, the town housed some of the most important maize haciendas in the state, due to its booming economy and the impulse to culture, Espita was considered one of the cultural centers of the Yucatan, and he was known by the nickname of "The Athens of Yucatan". Towards the second half of the twentieth century, the town experienced a decline in its development due in large part to the closure of the haciendas and the consequent decline of its economy.

Today is the fourth most populous town in the eastern of Yucatan, only after Valladolid, Tizimín and Chemax.

Toponimy
There are several versions of the original name of the town, the most accepted argument that was called "x pit há", which literally means "bit water" in the Yucatec Maya language.

The name Espita was given to the town by the Spanish while they were in the conquest of Yucatan. Espita name remained so for three centuries, until the September 15, 1876, when the town council changed the official name to Espita de Peniche Gutiérrez; same as, to date, completely not used in any official document.

History
Espita is an ancient town rich in traditions such as historical facts.

During pre-Hispanic times, the site where now stands the town belonged to the province of the cupules. Espita, as such, was founded during the spanish conquest of Yucatan near the 1520s. In 1549 the spanish established the encomienda system in the town, a short time later after the founding of this population.

During 1825 it became part of the party of Tizimin. Around November 30, 1840, was placed as head of the eponymous party created the same year.

On February 15, 1848, despite resistance from their neighbors, Espita fell into the hands of indigenous rebels during the Caste War, same as in 1850 led the espitans to defend the people against the attack of the indigenous rebels in known as the heroic deeds of the large fifteen of Espita.

On April 29, 1852, the Honorable Legislature of the State rose the place to the category of town. During September 15, 1876, the town council changed the official name to Espita de Peniche Gutiérrez.

Geography

Climate

Demographics 

According to the 2005 census made by the INEGI, the population of the town was 10,758 (74.54% of the municipality), of which 5,429 were men and 5,329 women. According to CONAPO, the expected population of 2010 is 12,110 people and 12,390 in 2011.

Education

Culture

Popular festivities 
The festivities in honor of baby Jesus, who along with Saint Joseph is the catholic patron saint of Espita, held from December 19 to 29, being the December 25 the main day of festivities.

Are held apart from the various religious ceremonies, bullfights, gremios (dances during the day), dances in the evenings and traditional vaquerías. The final day is usually a walk around town and sang happy birthday to the saint accompanied by mariachis.

The county fair usually runs until the December 31 and it will receive visitors from all neighboring towns and families with origins in the town who live mainly in the cities of Cancun and Merida, Yucatan.

Since 2009, the fair activities are managed by the group called "Asociación de Palqueros en Fortalecimiento de Nuestras Tradiciones" which is responsible for overseeing the activities of the celebration in honor of baby Jesus.

During the month of March is celebrated in San José, which is the main employer in the community since before 1650, and in his honor was erected in the village church, although not given as much attention as the December celebration. Unlike the celebration of December 25, the feast of San José is limited to masses and lacks a community festival with dairy, dancing and bullfights.

See also 
 Espita Municipality
 Yucatán (state)

References

Bibliography

External links

 Espita.gob.mx – Official site of the town. (site temporarily suspended)
 Panoramio – Espita's photos at Panoramio.

Populated places in Yucatán